The São João River is a tributary of the Rio Negro in Santa Catarina state, southeastern Brazil. It is part of the Paraná River basin.

See also
List of rivers of Santa Catarina

References
 Map from Ministry of Transport

Rivers of Santa Catarina (state)